Seán Doherty (died 17 March 1985) was an Irish Fianna Fáil politician. He was elected to Dáil Éireann as a Fianna Fáil Teachta Dála (TD) for the Mayo North constituency at the 1957 general election. He did not contest the 1961 general election.

References

Year of birth missing
1985 deaths
Fianna Fáil TDs
Members of the 16th Dáil
Politicians from County Mayo